The BYO Split Series is a series of albums put out by BYO Records. Each album is a split album which features two bands, with each band doing a cover of the other bands music on the album. The series started in 1999, and so far contains 5 releases.

Releases

References

External links
BYO Split Series at Discogs